The English Riviera is the third studio album by English electronic music band Metronomy, released on 8 April 2011 by Because Music. Following the release of their second studio album, Nights Out (2008), founding member Gabriel Stebbing left the band (on this album, Olugbenga Adelekan had joined on bass and Anna Prior had joined on drums). However, Stebbing recorded the bass parts on the album prior to his departure.

The album was nominated for the 2011 Mercury Prize.

Singles
"She Wants" was released as the lead single from the album on 26 January 2011. The promo video (directed in Jul & Mat) takes place during a house party with the action being played out in reverse in one continuous take. The bandmembers are absent although pictures of the group's faces can be seen throughout the video. At one point a QR code is mounted on a wall, providing an interactive feature that allows fans to access the Metronomy website after being scanned.

"The Look" was released as the second single on 11 March 2011. The video, directed by Lorenzo Fonda, depicts the band performing the song in a white room alongside stop motion animated sequences featuring seagulls. The band scenes were filmed in London while the animation was produced in Los Angeles. Frontman Joseph Mount is seen playing a Yamaha Electone EX-2 organ. The song is played over the end titles of the 2013 Pedro Almodóvar film I'm So Excited!

The third single, "The Bay", was released on 10 June 2011. The video, directed by David Wilson, intersperses bird's-eye views of Torbay (known as the English Riviera) and the band performing the song at various places in Torquay where the video was shot.

"Everything Goes My Way" was released on 17 October 2011 as the album's fourth and final single. The video features the band along with guest vocalist Roxanne Clifford having a stroll in a nature reserve surrounded by deer.

Critical reception

NME placed the album at number two on its list of the "Top 50 Albums of 2011", while Uncut and Q listed the album at numbers three and seventeen, respectively. Mike Williams of NME wrote, "With this, his third full-length album, Joe Mount has transformed his Metronomy project from a jaunty, brilliant, yet ultimately niche electro outfit into one of the most expansive and visionary pop bands in the country".

Track listing

Personnel
Credits adapted from the liner notes of The English Riviera.

Metronomy
 Joseph Mount – vocals ; drums ; guitar ; Juno-60 ; percussion ; handclaps ; Minimoog ; Moog Source ; Solina String Ensemble ; bass guitar ; talk box, Yamaha CS-80 ; Wurlitzer 200A ; congas, EDP Wasp ; Moog modular ; Yamaha CS-50 ; clavinet, Yamaha CS2x ; arrangement 
 Oscar Cash – guitar ; saxophone ; handclaps ; Siel Orchestra ; Juno-60 
 Anna Prior – backing vocals ; drums ; vocals, handclaps 
 Olugbenga Adelekan – bass guitar, handclaps

Additional musicians
 Harriet Wheeler – violin 
 Gabriel Stebbing – bass guitar ; handclaps ; guitar solo 
 Roxanne Clifford – vocals 
 Ash Workman – handclaps 
 Marion Cassan – vocals 
 Nicole Elizabeth – backing vocals

Technical
 Ash Workman – engineering, mixing
 Jedidiah Allcock – engineering assistance
 Jamie Bell – engineering assistance
 Julien Noudin – engineering assistance
 Nilesh – mastering
 Joseph Mount – production

Artwork
 John Gorham – cover image
 Grégoire Alexandre – photography
 Joseph Mount – art direction
 Aaron Larney – design layout

Charts

Weekly charts

Year-end charts

Certifications

In 2012, the album was certified 2× Gold by the Independent Music Companies Association (IMPALA), denoting sales in excess of 150,000 copies across Europe.

Release history

References

2011 albums
Because Music albums
Metronomy albums